The Buddha Temple is a temple dedicated to Buddha, at Buddhamangalam, Nagapattinam district, Tamil Nadu, India.

Location
This temple, one of the Buddha temples in Tamil Nadu, is located at Buddhamangalam in Kilvelur taluk of Nagapattinam district. This is one of the earlier Buddhist centres of Tamil Nadu.

Statue
The Buddha statue in this temple is found in sitting posture on a pedestal. The face is not clear. The temple is not maintained now.

Reference

External links 
 டெல்டா மாவட்டங்களில் பராமரிப்பின்றி புத்தர் சிலைகள், தினமலர், 27 ஏப்ரல் 2014
 சு.மாதவன், தமிழர் வாழ்வியலுக்கு பௌத்த சமணத்தின் கொடை, திண்ணை, 3 அக்டோபர் 2016
 ஸ்டாலின் ராஜாங்கம், சூடாமணி புத்த விகாரும் அம்பேத்கர் நாள் விழாவும்!, மின்னம்பலம், 22 ஏப்ரல் 2018
 இன்று புத்த ஞாயிற்றின் பெருநாள், டிஎன்பிஎஸ்சி தேர்வுப்பெட்டகம், தினமணி இதழிலிருந்து, 18 மே 2019